The 2017 Camellia Bowl was a postseason college football bowl game played at the Cramton Bowl in Montgomery, Alabama, on December 16, 2017. The game was the fourth edition of the Camellia Bowl and featured the Middle Tennessee Blue Raiders of Conference USA and the Arkansas State Red Wolves of the Sun Belt Conference. Sponsored by broadcasting company Raycom Media, the game was officially known as the Raycom Media Camellia Bowl.

Teams

Middle Tennessee Blue Raiders

The Middle Tennessee Blue Raiders finished the 2017 regular season with a 6–6 record. This was their first appearance in the Camellia Bowl.

Arkansas State Red Wolves

The Arkansas State Red Wolves finished the 2017 regular season with a 7–4 record. This was their first appearance in the Camellia Bowl.

Game summary

Scoring summary

Statistics

References

External links
Game statistics at camelliabowl.com

2017–18 NCAA football bowl games
Camellia Bowl
Arkansas State Red Wolves football bowl games
Middle Tennessee Blue Raiders football bowl games
December 2017 sports events in the United States
2017 in sports in Alabama